The Virginia Department of Transportation (VDOT) is the agency of the state government responsible for transportation in the state of Virginia in the United States. VDOT is headquartered at the Virginia Department of Highways Building in downtown Richmond. VDOT is responsible for building, maintaining, and operating the roads, bridges, and tunnels in the commonwealth. It is overseen by the Commonwealth Transportation Board, which has the power to fund airports, seaports, rail, and public transportation.

VDOT's revised annual budget for fiscal year 2019 is $5.4 billion.

VDOT has a workforce of about 7,500 full-time employees.

Responsibilities 

Virginia has the nation's third largest system of state-maintained highways, after North Carolina and Texas. The Virginia highway system totals approximately 58,000 miles of interstate, primary, frontage, and secondary roads. The system includes about 20,000 bridges and structures. In addition, independent cities and towns, as well as the counties of Henrico and Arlington, maintain approximately 12,000 miles of local streets, and receive funds from the state for that purpose.

VDOT operates and maintains:

 Roads: VDOT's largest responsibility is the maintenance of roads. Filling potholes, storm drain cleaning, water drainage, guard rail replacement, bridge work, tree removal, and trash removal, as well as the maintenance of signs and traffic lights.
 More than 21,000 bridges and structures
 Snow removal: VDOT is responsible for removing snow along the major roads of Virginia.
 Forty-one safety rest areas and ten welcome centers along major highways
More than 100 commuter parking lots
Four underwater crossings in the Hampton Roads area:
The mid-town Elizabeth River tunnel
The downtown Elizabeth River tunnel
The Hampton Roads Bridge-Tunnel on Interstate 64
The Monitor-Merrimac Memorial Bridge-Tunnel on Interstate 664

Two mountain tunnels on Interstate 77 in southwest Virginia:
East River Mountain Tunnel
Big Walker Mountain Tunnel
 Two toll roads:
 Fairfax County's Dulles Toll Road (operated and maintained by MWAA)
 The Powhite Parkway Extension near Richmond
One toll bridge: The George P. Coleman Memorial Bridge
Three ferry services:
 Jamestown Ferry
 Sunny Bank
 Merry Point

Budget 
Highway maintenance and operations represent 41% of the total budget, followed by 32% for highway systems construction. Smaller portions of the budget are directed to address the needs and requirements of debt service, support to other agencies, administration, and earmarks and special financing.

Sources

(in millions)

Expenditures

(in millions)

Districts 

Virginia is divided into nine districts:

Bristol District
Counties: Bland, Buchanan, Dickenson, Grayson, Lee, Russell, Scott, Smyth, Tazewell, Washington, Wise and Wythe
Cities: Bristol, Norton
Salem District
Counties: Bedford, Botetourt, Carroll, Craig, Floyd, Franklin, Giles, Henry, Montgomery, Patrick, Pulaski and Roanoke
Cities: Bedford, Galax, Martinsville, Radford, Roanoke and Salem
Lynchburg District
Counties: Amherst, Appomattox, Buckingham, Campbell, Charlotte, Cumberland, Halifax, Nelson, Pittsylvania and Prince Edward
Cities: Danville and Lynchburg
Richmond District
Counties: Amelia, Brunswick, Charles City, Chesterfield, Dinwiddie, Goochland, Hanover, Henrico, Lunenburg, Mecklenburg, New Kent, Nottoway, Powhatan, and Prince George
Cities: Colonial Heights, Hopewell, Petersburg, and Richmond
Hampton Roads District
Counties: Accomack, Isle of Wight, James City, Northampton, Southampton, Surry, Sussex, York, and Greensville
Cities: Chesapeake, Emporia, Franklin, Hampton, Newport News, Norfolk, Poquoson, Portsmouth, Suffolk, Virginia Beach, and Williamsburg
Fredericksburg District
Counties: Caroline, Essex, Gloucester, King and Queen, King George, King William, Lancaster, Mathews, Middlesex, Northumberland, Richmond, Spotsylvania, Stafford, and Westmoreland
Cities: Fredericksburg
Culpeper District
Counties: Albemarle, Culpeper, Fauquier, Fluvanna, Greene, Louisa, Madison, Orange, and Rappahannock
Cities: Charlottesville
Staunton District
Counties: Alleghany, Augusta, Bath, Clarke, Frederick, Highland, Page, Rockbridge, Rockingham, Shenandoah, and Warren
Cities: Buena Vista, Covington, Harrisonburg, Lexington, Staunton, Waynesboro, and Winchester
Northern Virginia District
Counties: Arlington, Fairfax, Loudoun, and Prince William
Cities: Alexandria, Fairfax, Falls Church, Manassas, and Manassas Park

District Notes

511 

Many US states, as well as several US local governments and Canadian provinces, provide 511 systems. VDOT provides the Virginia 511 service, which may be accessed by the 511 telephone number, the https://www.511virginia.org/ website, and Twitter.  In May 2012, VDOT introduced the Virginia 511 smartphone apps for Apple and Android devices. The Virginia 511 system provides traffic cameras, real-time road and traffic conditions, trip planning, weather information, and alternatives to traveling by car.

Controversies

Closing of rest areas 
Drivers complained that people who needed to use the restroom would have nowhere to go. VDOT countered that the I-95 corridor is highly developed, and many businesses have restrooms, and that closing the rest stops would save VDOT 9 million dollars toward its 2.6 billion dollar budget deficit.

In January 2010, governor Bob McDonnell announced that he would reopen all of the closed rest areas as part of his campaign promises. The state is using an "adopt a rest stop" program, pulling 3 million dollars from the reserve maintenance fund, and employing non-violent inmates to help reopen the rest stops. They all reopened on April 17, 2010.

Roadside memorials 

Spontaneous roadside memorials, often in the form of white crosses, Stars of David, bouquets of flowers, and photos of the dead, have been placed along roads at the scenes of fatal accidents.  As of July 1, 2003, Virginia law has banned these memorials.  Transportation officials have deemed them a threat to the safety of motorists.

Virginia law §33.2-216 prohibits any person from installing a memorial on any highway controlled by the VDOT without a permit. VDOT will install a roadside memorial sign, normally for a period of two years. The sign may not deviate from the standard roadside memorial sign specifications. The cost must by paid by the person requesting the sign.

Not everyone agreed with the new program. Vowing to ignore the program, Del. Robert G. Marshall (R-Prince William), whose son was killed in an auto accident along Interstate 81 in November 2001, said:

This is the bureaucratization of love. I don't like it one bit. I intend to put a cross up for my son. Period.

By marking an accident site, survivors create "a living memory of this person's life," said Donna Schuurman, president of Association for Death Education and Counseling. Americans have swept the grieving process under the rug, and now it's popping up in public ways that few expected—and that some don't like, according to Ms. Schuurman.

HOT lanes 

In 1995, Virginia passed the Public-Private Transportation Act (PPTA), which allows the state to enter into agreements with private entities to construct, improve, maintain and operate transportation facilities. Since then, Virginia has proposed or awarded several PPTA contracts, including:

Capital Beltway (I-495) HOT Lanes (Completed in November 2012)
14 miles of four HOV/HOT lanes on the Capital Beltway between the Springfield Interchange and just north of the Dulles Toll Road
I-95 / I-395 HOT Lanes (proposed)
56 miles from the Pentagon to Spotsylvania County
The HOT lanes were complete in December 2014, but the lanes stretch from just north of Edsall Road to Garrisonville

High-occupancy toll lanes (HOT lanes) are toll lanes operating alongside existing highway lanes.  They provided drivers with a faster and more reliable travel option. Buses, carpools, motorcycles and emergency vehicles will be able to use the HOT lanes for free while drivers with fewer than three occupants can use the HOT lanes by paying a toll.  The HOT lanes will use dynamic or congestion pricing to manage the number vehicles, and to keep them free-flowing.  On average, vehicles are expected to be traveling 55 miles per hour, even during peak travel times.

The first HOT Lanes in the nation to open was the 91 Express Lanes project in Orange County, California, opening in December 1995.  A computer adjusts the toll every six minutes, raising it if too many cars are on the highway, lowering it if the highway is underutilized.  Even drivers who won't pay the toll appreciate the HOT lanes diverting traffic form the regular highway.

But many people are not happy about the proposed HOT lanes in Northern Virginia.  In 2001, Maryland governor Parris N. Glendening (D) stopped a state study of similar proposals for the Maryland side of the Capital Beltway.  The governor believed it would be unfair to low-income residents to allow affluent drivers to buy their way out of traffic.

In 2003, Virginia Department of Transportation Commissioner Philip A. Shucet stated that "[s]ingle drivers could pay $1 to $4 to get off of the congested regular lanes." By 2009, transportation planners in Washington estimated the projected rush-hour toll need to be $1.60 a mile. According to VDOT's web site:

There will be no toll cap, as tolls must be able to increase to the level necessary to manage real-time traffic demand and keep the lanes congestion free.

Those who own property along the path of the Capital Beltway HOT Lanes are growing increasingly agitated with the project.  Supervisor Sharon Bulova (D-Braddock), who represents a number of neighborhoods affected by the construction, said,

Once the project is truly underway, eventually pretty much all the trees in the VDOT right of way are going to be cleared ... I know I didn't have an appreciation of the extent of the clearing that was going to be done ... Do they really need to clear every teeny piece of vegetation in their right of way?

History 
The Virginia General Assembly established the first State Highway Commission in 1906. 

In 1927, the Virginia Department of Highways (VDH) was established as a state agency. 

VDH became the Virginia Department of Highways and Transportation (VDHT) in 1974, adding railroads and public transportation to its portfolio.  

In 1986, the General Assembly authorized expanded revenue sources for transportation, including airports and seaports.  Also during that same special session, the General Assembly formally renamed the agency the Virginia Department of Transportation (VDOT).  

The General Assembly spun off VDOT's rail and public transportation into a new department, the Department of Rail and Public Transportation (DPRT).  DPRT reports directly to the Virginia Secretary of Transportation.

External links 

VDOT Official Website

References 

Transportation in Virginia
State departments of transportation of the United States
Transportation
1906 establishments in Virginia